Brie (Gallo: Beriy) is a commune in the Ille-et-Vilaine department in Brittany in northwestern France.

Geography 
The bordering municipalities are: Janzé, Saulnières, Chanteloup and Corps-Nuds.

History
The name of the locality is attested in Plebs Beria forms in 1096, Berie in 1240, and Beria in 1516. The origin of the word is the Celtic  or  "bridge", or Gallic briga, "fortified height".

Heraldry 
The coat of arms shows argent with three crenellated fasces of sand.
The official status of the coat of arms remains to be determined.

Gallery

List of mayors
The mayor is Bernard Jamet PS Farmer.

Population 

In 2017, the commune had 950 inhabitants, an increase of 23% compared to 2007. Inhabitants of Brie are called  in French.

See also
Communes of the Ille-et-Vilaine department

References

External links
 
Mayors of Ille-et-Vilaine Association 

Communes of Ille-et-Vilaine